Clock House may refer to the following places in England:

 Clock House, London, an area near Beckenham, in the London Borough of Bromley
Clock House railway station
 Clock House Brickworks, a palaeoenvironmental site in Surrey